Events from the year 2006 in the European Union.

Incumbents
 Commission President
 José Manuel Barroso
 Council Presidency:
 Austria (January – June)
 Finland (July - December)
 Parliament President
 Josep Borrell
 High Representative
 Javier Solana

Events
 1 January: Austria takes the Presidency.
 2 February:
The Commission launches a white paper on communication policy.
European Commission Vice-President Franco Frattini backs the freedom of speech of Danish newspaper Jyllands-Posten during the Jyllands-Posten Muhammad cartoons controversy.
 16 February: The Commission's 'Bolkestein Directive' is approved at its first reading by the MEPs admit large protests outside the Parliament.
 7 April: .eu domain opens to the public.
 4 May: The Commission adopts a green paper on the European Transparency Initiative.
 3 June: Montenegro declares independence, leads to separate relations and accession negotiations.
 21 June: Barroso attends EU-US summit in Vienna.
 1 July: Finland takes the Presidency.
 12 July: Kroes gives Microsoft a 280.5 million euro fine for its anti-competitive behaviour.
 24 July: The Council adopts a common position on the Bolkestein Directive
 15 November: European Parliament adopts the Bolkestein Directive at its second reading.
 12 December: Parliament approves the Bulgarian and Romanian Commissioners despite concerns over the weakness of the Multilingualism portfolio.

References

External links
 Video: What has Europe done for you in 2006?

 
Years of the 21st century in the European Union
2000s in the European Union